Ina Lu (Chinese name: 呂怡慧 Lǚ Yíhuì), born 1982 in Taiwan, is a South African Chinese beauty from Johannesburg. She was Miss Chinese International 2006.

Miss Chinese South Africa

Ina won the crown of Miss Chinese South Africa 2005, organized by the Chinese community from China, Hong Kong, and Taiwan on January 29, 2005.  She beat out 11 other delegates including her sister, Ivy Lu. Ivy was the 1st runner up in Hong Kong for the 2007 title, as the Miss Chinese South Africa pageant is held every two years, but the MCIP is held every year (the top 2 competes).

Miss Chinese International 2006

She then represented Johannesburg at the Miss Chinese International Pageant 2006. Being considered a favorite due to her figure and smile, she won Johannesburg's first crown. She beat out favorites like Tracy Ip (who did not reach the final 5) of Hong Kong, Crystal Li of Vancouver, and Elva Ni of Toronto for the crown. Before Ina's win, 1995's Miss Chinese South Africa Linda Li was Johannesburg's best showing at Miss Chinese International, placing in the Top 5.

Post-pageant
Instead of taking an offer to join the Hong Kong entertainment industry right away by signing with TVB, Ina returned to Johannesburg to continue her studies.

Succession

Lu crowned her successor Sarah Song of Sydney, Australia as Miss Chinese International 2007 on January 20, 2007. The first runner up at the pageant was Lu's younger sister Ivy of Johannesburg, South Africa. As a result, both Lus almost became the first sister pair in the history of the pageant to win the crown.

External links
Official profile on Miss Chinese International Website

1982 births
People from Johannesburg
Living people
Miss Chinese International winners
South African people of Chinese descent
Taiwanese emigrants to South Africa